MaliVai Washington was the defending champion, but lost in the first round this year.

Horacio de la Peña won the title, defeating Jaime Yzaga 3–6, 6–3, 6–4 in the final.

Seeds
A champion seed is indicated in bold text while text in italics indicates the round in which that seed was eliminated.

  MaliVai Washington (first round)
  Todd Martin (semifinals)
  Jaime Yzaga (final)
  Jeff Tarango (first round)
  Horst Skoff (first round)
  Derrick Rostagno (quarterfinals)
  Jacco Eltingh (quarterfinals)
  Gilbert Schaller (second round)

Draw

References

External links
 Singles draw

Singles